Jacques Berthe (20 July 1926 – 19 April 1981) was a French water polo player. He competed in the men's tournament at the 1948 Summer Olympics.

References

External links
 

1926 births
1981 deaths
French male water polo players
Olympic water polo players of France
Water polo players at the 1948 Summer Olympics
Place of birth missing